Dennis Jon McKenna (born December 17, 1950 in Paonia, Colorado) is an American ethnopharmacologist, research pharmacognosist, lecturer and author. He is the brother of well-known psychedelics proponent Terence McKenna and is a founding board member and the director of ethnopharmacology at the Heffter Research Institute, a non-profit organization concerned with the investigation of the potential therapeutic uses of psychedelic medicines.

Education 
McKenna received his Master's degree in botany at the University of Hawaii in 1979. He received his doctorate in botanical sciences in 1984 from the University of British Columbia, where he wrote a dissertation entitled Monoamine oxidase inhibitors in Amazonian hallucinogenic plants: ethnobotanical, phytochemical, and pharmacological investigations. McKenna then received post-doctoral research fellowships in the Laboratory of Clinical Pharmacology, National Institute of Mental Health, and in the Department of Neurology, Stanford University School of Medicine.

Career 
McKenna's research led to the development of natural products for Aveda Corporation as well as greater awareness of natural products and medicines. He has authored numerous scientific articles and books. He co-authored The Invisible Landscape with his brother Terence and Botanical Medicines: the Desk Reference for Major Herbal Supplements with Kenneth Jones and Kerry Hughes. McKenna spent a number of years as a senior lecturer for the Center for Spirituality and Healing, part of the Academic Health Center at the University of Minnesota, Twin Cities. He is became a senior research scientist for the Natural Health Products Research Group at the British Columbia Institute of Technology in the Vancouver area.

His research has included the pharmacology, botany, and chemistry of ayahuasca and oo-koo-hé, the subjects of his master's thesis. He has also conducted extensive fieldwork in the Peruvian, Colombian, and Brazilian Amazon.

Psilocybin mushroom cultivation

During the early 1970s Jeremy Bigwood and the McKenna brothers developed a technique for cultivating psilocybin mushrooms and they published what they had learned in a book entitled Psilocybin - Magic Mushroom Grower's Guide. The team of Bigwood and the McKennas were the first to come up with a reliable method for cultivating psilocybin mushrooms at home.

Other 
McKenna's memoir, The Brotherhood of the Screaming Abyss, about his and his brother Terence's life and journeys together, was published in 2012.

He is featured in the documentary DMT: The Spirit Molecule.

McKenna participated in the first Evolver Convergence 2012 in Pittsburgh, June 1–4.

He has been the main guest several times on the popular radio show Coast to Coast AM. His last appearance on the show was the Sunday March 23, 2014 episode.

On December 16, 2012, April 17, 2017, and June 21, 2018, McKenna was the guest on The Joe Rogan Experience podcast.

Dennis was also a key guest on The Cosmic Echo Podcast on September 18th, 2018.

Bibliography
 
 
 The Incense Bible: Plant Scents That Transcend World Culture, Medicine, and Spirituality (2007)
 
 The Brotherhood of the Screaming Abyss (2012)
 Aya Awakenings: A Shamanic Odyssey (2013)
 Return to the Brain of Eden: Restoring the Connection between Neurochemistry and Consciousness (2014)

References

External links 

 Biography and publications list at Heffter Research Institute
 Erowid's Dennis McKenna Vault
 
 2009 – Cognition Factor (2009)

1950 births
Living people
Academic staff of the British Columbia Institute of Technology
Psychedelic drug researchers
American psychedelic drug advocates
Ethnobotanists
20th-century American writers
21st-century American writers
People from Paonia, Colorado